Annett Rex (born 13 December 1969) is a German swimmer. She competed in the women's 100 metre breaststroke at the 1988 Summer Olympics representing East Germany.

References

External links
 

1969 births
Living people
German female swimmers
Olympic swimmers of East Germany
Swimmers at the 1988 Summer Olympics
Swimmers from Berlin